Maja e Vallamarës is a mountain peak belonging to the Gramos mountain in southern Albania as well as in northern Greece.

References 

Mountains of Albania